Krasiao Dam is in Huai Khamin Subdistrict, Dan Chang District, Suphan Buri Province, Thailand. It was built in 1980. It is an earthen dam built to store water from the Krasiao River. Its length is 4,250 meters and its height is 32.5 meters. The capacity of the dam is 240 million metres3. It is the longest earthen dam in Thailand. Its beneficial area is 350,000 rai.

References

External links
 Freshwater Fishery Prevention and Suppression Unit, Krasiao Suphanburi Dam

Dams in Thailand
Buildings and structures in Suphan Buri province